Geoffrey William Chard AM (born 9 August 1930 in Sydney, New South Wales, Australia) is an Australian opera singer. He was a foundation member of the National Opera of New South Wales.

In 1956, Chard appeared in The Marriage of Figaro, in the inaugural production of the Australian Elizabethan Trust Opera Company.

Chard went to England in 1961 and performed with many British opera companies, including the Welsh National Opera, Glyndebourne, the Royal Opera Company at Covent Garden, and at the Aldeburgh Festival and Edinburgh Festival.

He was a principal baritone with the English National Opera for 15 years, from 1969 to 1985, performing many major roles, including some roles which were specially written for him.  He also appeared as Sergeant Meryll in the 1982 television production of The Yeomen of the Guard.

Returning briefly to Australia in 1982, Chard appeared with the Lyric Opera of Queensland, and, since his permanent return to Australia, in 1985, he has performed many major roles with the Australian Opera.

Chard's opera roles include: Don Alfonso in Così fan tutte, Rangoni in Boris Godunov, Scarpia in Tosca, Nick Shadow in The Rake's Progress, Balstrode in Peter Grimes, Don Pizarro in Fidelio, Paolo in Simon Boccanegra, Tonio in Pagliacci, the title role in Gianni Schicchi, and the title role in Voss.

Honour
In 1988 he was appointed a Member (AM) of the Order of Australia for service to opera.

References

External links

Geoffrey Chard biography (part 1) — Voss

1930 births
Living people
Australian operatic baritones
Members of the Order of Australia
Singers from Sydney
20th-century Australian male opera singers